Martyrs' Day (at the national level also known as Sarvodaya day or Shaheed Diwas) are days declared in India to honour recognised martyrs of the nation.

National observance

30 January

Martyrs' Day is recognised nationally on the 30 January to mark the assassination of Mahatma Gandhi in 1948, by Nathuram Godse. 

On Martyrs' Day the President, the Vice President, the Prime Minister, the Defence Minister, the Chief of Defence Staff and the three Service Chiefs gather at the samadhi at Raj Ghat memorial and lay wreaths decorated with multi-colour flowers. The armed forces' personnel blow bugles, sounding the Last Post. The inter-services contingent reverse arms as a mark of respect. A two-minute silence in memory of Indian martyrs is observed throughout the country at 11 am. Participants hold all-religion prayers and sing tributes.

Other recognised dates

15 February
In 2022, the government of Bihar recognised 15 February as a Martyrs' Day (Shahid Diwas) in memory of 34 demonstrators killed by police in Tarapur on 15 February 1932.

23 March
The anniversary of the deaths of Bhagat Singh, Sukhdev Thapar and Shivaram Rajguru on 23 March 1931, in Lahore, is recognised as a Martyrs' Day.

19 May

19 May is recognised as Bhasha Shahid Divas ("Language Martyrs' Day") in the Barak Valley, recognising the deaths of 11 people killed during the Bengali Language Movement. The movement, which took place in the Barak Valley in the state of Assam, was a protest against the decision of the Government of Assam to make Assamese the only official language of the state even though a significant proportion of the population were Bengali people. In the Barak Valley, the Sylheti-speaking Bengali population constitute the majority of the population. The main incident, in which 11 people were killed by state police, took place on 19 May 1961 at Silchar railway station.(Raktim Diganta, Natun Diganta Prakashani, Silchar, Assam).

21 October

21 October is Police Martyrs' Day (or Police Commemoration Day), observed by police departments nationwide. On this date in 1958 a Central Reserve Police Force patrol at the Indo-Tibetan border in Ladakh was ambushed by Chinese forces, as part of the ongoing Sino-Indian border dispute.

17 November

Odisha observes 17 November, the death anniversary of Lala Lajpat Rai (1864–1927), the "Lion of Punjab, a leader in the Indian fight for freedom from the British Raj.

19 November
The birthday of Rani Lakshmibai, 19 November 1828, queen of the Maratha-ruled princely state of Jhansi, is observed as Martyrs' Day in the region, and honours those who gave their lives in the rebellion of 1857, of which she was a leading figure.

24 November
The death anniversary of the ninth Sikh Guru Tegh Bahadur on 24 November 1674, who was executed by the Mughal emperor Aurangzeb, is observed as Martyrs' Day.

See also
Martyrs' Day

References

Indian independence movement
Public holidays in India
Observances in India
Assassination of Mahatma Gandhi
January observances
March observances
June observances
October observances
November observances
Memorials to Lala Lajpat Rai